The Gallina or Largo-Gallina culture was an occupation sequence during the pre-Hispanic period in the American Southwest from approximately 1050 to 1300. The culture was located in north-central New Mexico roughly north of the Jemez Mountains, and was named after the Rio Gallina (and Largo Canyon), which runs through the region.

Ancestry
The Gallina are tentatively linked to the Rosa Phase of the Ancestral Puebloans. Evidence indicates a connection to the Rosa people, due to similar skills such as basket weaving, black on white pottery, and architecture.  They also have similar ornaments such as shells pierced for stringing, bone beads, and stone pipes.

Tools and artifacts

Artifacts from the Gallina time period are often hard to classify.  For example, what archeologists originally classified as scrapers later proved to be knives.  Frequently, assessing an object itself is not enough; it becomes necessary to analyze type as well as evidence of use and wear.  Commonly found artifacts include vessels and jars.  There are indications that the Gallina were advanced at basket weaving.  They also may have traded local stone such as Jemez Mountain Obsidian and Pedernal Chert.

Pottery

Some pottery and reusable vessels imitate the Rosa style but still have distinctly different characteristics.  For instance, the wide mouth cook pots found commonly at Gallina sites are not seen among Rosa artifacts.  Also, all jars found at Rosa sites have flat bottoms whereas the Gallina jars commonly have a tapering underbody that end in a point.   This was probably designed to allow the jar to be settled upright in a bed of ashes in the fire pit.  The Gallina also modified the necks of their jars, more than likely designed to allow the jar to be easier to hold.   The Gallina are also recognized for their black on white pottery designs that, while not completely accurate, are still more complex than any patterns found at Rosa sites.

Architecture
Gallina architecture was also influenced by the Rosa style.  Villages ranged from three to twenty dwellings and were generally combinations of surface structures and pit houses with north-south orientation.   The pit houses were often dug in the high points of mesas and then completely palisaded.  Surface houses often had storage bins that extended off the east and west side of the house.  These houses were generally "unit-type" which has thick walls of unworked stones in mud mortar.  The interiors of these houses were smooth and neatly plastered.   They also contained fire pits with U-shaped deflectors that directed heat and caught ash.   There was generally a ventilator shaft through the wall that followed the north-south orientation of the house.  The interior roofs were left as beams and bags were hung from them as a storage method.  The surface houses were always rectangular, however, the pit houses could be round or rectangular and tunnels connected pit and surface houses. These houses were moderately transitory as there is some evidence that the Gallina would leave a dwelling to move short distances, probably to follow the rainfall.

Towers
The Gallina constructed masonry towers along ridges.    The towers generally had thick walls and better than usual masonry.  This thickness was probably designed to support the weight.  The towers were not designed as two-story buildings and generally simply entered on the high level by a ladder.  These towers were possibly signal stations similar to a line of telegraph stations.  Another possibility is that the towers were simply used for storage or any food that was not immediately consumed.

Religion
Sipapus and kivas, the standard material indications of Ancestral Puebloan religions that were contemporaneous with the Gallina, have not been discovered in the Gallina area. A few possible examples were noted by Florence Hawley Ellis, but their identification is tenuous.

Drought
Starting in 1161, the ecological condition shifted toward drought conditions.  Although not every year was bad, the pattern was increasingly dry.  From 1250 to 1265 the drought was particularly bad, and the years 1278 and 1292 were the worst.  However the crops really became impacted from 1171-1296.   All of the dates for droughts and predicted impact on crops are based on conifer growth (from tree rings).

Camps and mountain dwellings
At some point during difficult drought conditions, some members traveled from villages to camp on Canjilon Mountain in order to hunt and gather.  Each of these mountain camps had two to ten people and brought a cook pot, water jar, food bowl, and canteen with them, opting not actually to make pottery in the camps.  The camps were thought to be more hunting-oriented based on the arrows, knives, and scrapers found at the sites.  The camps were most frequently located on lava beds because of the retention and radiation of the sun’s heat off the rock.  The warmth may have allowed small plots for farming, although this is still under debate. Flat pieces of lava were adapted for group workplaces and drying meat and plant foods. The dwellings and drying areas had paths leading to them that were sometimes "paved" with slabs of rock or filled in with chinking stones. Ellis believed these sites to be associated with the Gallina; many other archaeologists, however, do not.

Abandonment and/or disappearance
Most Gallina sites discovered are found to have been left in perfect order and followed a ritualistic pattern.  The fire pits were filled to the rim and then the floors were cleaned.  The house was given a quick burning and then the roof timbers were removed.  Archaeologists who follow the belief of abandonment tend to think that this was a process designed to minimize the abilities of someone to use personal artifacts left behind in witchcraft.  There is evidence that perhaps an exodus occurred beginning around 1275 until the culture had shifted to the Northern portion of Jemez.   However, there is evidence that perhaps the Gallina did not move voluntarily.  Almost every Gallina skeleton ever found has been that of someone murdered.  Broken necks are the most common and the skeletons rarely appear to have been buried.  Also commonly found has been remains of Gallina who were murdered, thrown into their homes, and then had the homes burned.  Some of the skeletons of the murder victims have been found in the towers.  The debate is ongoing for the cause of these murders.  Genocide has been considered, and so has internecine war.  The drought could offer evidence for either.   Although there is no hard evidence for either, research is ongoing.

References

Bibliography
Ford, R.I., A.Schroeder, and S.L. Peckham 1972	Three Perspectives on Puebloan Prehistory. In New Perspectives on the Pueblos, edited by A. Ortiz, School of American Research. University of New Mexico Press, Albuquerque.
Ellis, Florence.  “Canjilon Mountain Hunting and Gathering Sites.” From Drought to Drought: Gallina Cultural Patterns Volume 1. 1988.
Ancient Massacre Discovered in New Mexico -- Was It Genocide?, by Blake de Pastino, National Geographic News, July 12, 2007.
Stuart, David.  Glimpses of the Ancient Southwest.  Santa Fe, New Mexico: Ancient City Press. 1984.  (Only pages 86–92)
Historical Dictionary of North American Archeology
Handbook of North American Indians

Native American tribes in New Mexico
Native American history of New Mexico
Oasisamerica cultures
Pre-Columbian cultures